Hans Heinemann (born 14 August 1940) is a former Swiss cyclist. He competed in the team pursuit at the 1960 Summer Olympics and the road race at the 1964 Summer Olympics.

References

External links
 

1940 births
Living people
Swiss male cyclists
Olympic cyclists of Switzerland
Cyclists at the 1960 Summer Olympics
Cyclists at the 1964 Summer Olympics
People from Rapperswil-Jona
Sportspeople from the canton of St. Gallen